According to the Book of Mormon, a Rameumptom is a high tower or stand from which the Zoramites gave a rote prayer with both arms raised high. Several Book of Mormon characters (including Alma the Younger and his companions) viewed the practice of praying from a Rameumptom as sinful, largely because the prayer affirmed the Zoramites' belief that there would be no Christ, and that the Zoramites were elected to be saved while all around them were "elected to be cast... down to hell." 

The weekly prayer on the Rameumptom was the Zoramites' only religious observance, while for the rest of the week they never mentioned God and pursued a lavish and selfish lifestyle. 

In LDS culture, the term "Rameumptom" has a metaphoric meaning, signifying self-aggrandizement or hubris.

The word's etymology suggested by Mormon sources is possibly from the Hebrew rām or rāmâ, "to be high, to be exalted" (as in Isa 10:33 rāmê- “heights of”), and ˁōmed, meaning a "stand" or "place" (as in Nehemiah 8:7, 9:3, 13:11 ˁomdām “their standing, their place”).

References

External links
Chapter 28: The Zoramites and the Rameumptom, Book of Mormon Stories, (1997), 78–80
Book of Mormon words and phrases